Between the Lines Books (BTL) is an independent Toronto-based publisher of non-fiction, most of which offers a critical perspective on culture, economics, and society. Since its inception in 1977, BTL has published approximately 250 titles of which more than half are maintained in print, including seminal works by American cultural theorists bell hooks and Noam Chomsky.  In 2012, BTL won the Wilson Prize for Publishing Canadian History.

Over the course of its history, BTL has published titles on politics, public policy, labour, critical race, international development, indigenous peoples, gender and sexuality, history, health, adult and popular education, environment, technology, and media.

Organization 

Unlike most publishing houses, Between the Lines Books is a co-operative organization. There is no individual owner or publisher, and organizational decisions are reached by consensus. Publishing decisions are made by a volunteer editorial board.

Affiliates 

BTL is represented in the college and trade markets throughout Canada by Brunswick Books, a company that also handles their US and Canadian distribution. In the U.K. and continental Europe, sales representation and distribution are provided by Global Book Marketing and Central Books respectively. BTL has co-publishing arrangements with New Internationalist (UK), Pluto Press, South End Press, AK Press, PM Press, Haymarket, O/R Books, Zed Books, and LUX Editeur.

References

External links

Book publishing companies of Canada
Publishing companies established in 1977
1977 establishments in Ontario
Companies based in Toronto